A quarter-zipper is a type of cardigan or sweater with a zip that only goes down from the neck to the chest.

The style originated as sportswear in the mid 20th century.  The zip allowed the collar to be opened as needed to regulate temperature.  It was then used as leisurewear too.

In the 2020s, this style of garment was popular as smart casual wear for affluent men such as Rishi Sunak.  As dress codes were made more casual to accommodate trends such as working from home, the quarter-zipper was increasingly worn as stylish work wear, replacing the traditional business suit.

References

Tops (clothing)